Ivan Mitrev (Bulgarian: Иван Митрев; born 28 May 1999) is a Bulgarian footballer who plays as a winger or forward for Litex Lovech on loan from CSKA Sofia.

Career statistics

Club

References

External links
 

1999 births
Living people
Bulgarian footballers
Bulgaria youth international footballers
PFC CSKA Sofia players
PFC Litex Lovech players
First Professional Football League (Bulgaria) players
Association football midfielders
People from Sandanski
Sportspeople from Blagoevgrad Province
21st-century Bulgarian people